Chao-Li Chi (April 5, 1927 – October 16, 2010) was a Chinese-born American actor and dancer who worked extensively in American television, including his best known role as Chao-Li, the faithful majordomo and chauffeur of Jane Wyman's character in Falcon Crest. Additionally, his film credits include Big Trouble in Little China, The Joy Luck Club, The Nutty Professor, Wedding Crashers and The Prestige. He was featured in the short film by Maya Deren, Meditation on Violence, in 1948.

His brothers include the economist Ji Chaoding and diplomat Ji Chaozhu.

Early life and education
Chi was born in Shanxi, China, on April 5, 1927. He settled in New York City in 1939 with his family, including his younger brother Ji Chaozhu, as refugees from the Japanese invasion of China. He obtained a bachelor's degree from St. John's College, in Annapolis, Maryland. Chi also earned a master's degree from New York University and a second master's degree from The New School, which was known as the New School for Social Research at the time.

Career
Chi began studying acting under Pearl S. Buck at the East and West Association. He appeared as the lead performer in Maya Deren's 1948 film, Meditation on Violence. He continued to perform with Deren dance companies into the 1960s. In 1967, Chi became the Dance Director of the Living Arts Program in Dayton, Ohio, while touring with Deren.

Chi appeared in approximately fifty-one film and television roles during the course of his career. On television, Chi was perhaps best known for his role as Chao-Li in the 1980s soap opera Falcon Crest which aired for nine years on CBS. His other television credits included parts on M*A*S*H and Pushing Daisies. Chi's film credits included The Joy Luck Club, Big Trouble in Little China, The Prestige and Wedding Crashers. His theater credits included the travelling production of Flower Drum Song and the short lived musical Barbary Coast.

Chi moved to Los Angeles in 1975. A practicing Taoist, Chi co-founded the Taoist Sanctuary, which is now known as the Taoist Institute, in Hollywood. He taught courses in Tao Te Ching, I Ching, philosophy and T'ai chi at California State University, Los Angeles and the Lee Strasberg Theatre and Film Institute. He also taught T'ai chi at the Pacific Asia Museum in Pasadena, California, on Saturdays for more than thirty years.

Death
Chi died in his home in Granada Hills, California, on October 16, 2010, at the age of 83. He was survived by his wife, daughter and stepson.

Filmography

References

External links
 
Obituary Los Angeles Times

1927 births
2010 deaths
American male actors of Chinese descent
American male television actors
American male film actors
American male stage actors
American male dancers
American male soap opera actors
California State University, Los Angeles faculty
St. John's College (Annapolis/Santa Fe) alumni
New York University alumni
The New School alumni
American Taoists
Republic of China (1912–1949) emigrants to the United States
Male actors from New York City
People from Granada Hills, Los Angeles
Male actors from Los Angeles